In enzymology, a methylenetetrahydrofolate-tRNA-(uracil-5-)-methyltransferase is an enzyme that catalyzes the chemical reaction

5,10-methylenetetrahydrofolate + tRNA containing uridine at position 54 + FADH2  tetrahydrofolate + tRNA containing ribothymidine at position 54 + FAD

The 3 substrates of this enzyme are 5,10-methylenetetrahydrofolate, tRNA containing uridine at position 54, and FADH2, whereas its 3 products are tetrahydrofolate, tRNA containing ribothymidine at position 54, and FAD.

This enzyme belongs to the family of transferases, specifically those transferring one-carbon group methyltransferases.  The systematic name of this enzyme class is 5,10-methylenetetrahydrofolate:tRNA (uracil-5-)-methyl-transferase. Other names in common use include (FADH2-oxidizing), folate-dependent ribothymidyl synthase, methylenetetrahydrofolate-transfer ribonucleate uracil, 5-methyltransferase, 5,10-methylenetetrahydrofolate:tRNA-UPsiC, and (uracil-5-)-methyl-transferase.

References

 
 

EC 2.1.1
Enzymes of unknown structure